The 1988–89 Bulgarian Cup was the 49th season of the Bulgarian Cup. CSKA Sofia won the competition, beating Chernomorets Burgas 3–0 in the final at the Slavi Aleksiev Stadium in Pleven.

First round

Group 1

|-
!colspan=5 style="background-color:#D0F0C0;" |7 / 14 September 1988

|-
!colspan=5 style="background-color:#D0F0C0;" |6 / 27 October 1988

|}
Yantra Gabrovo was eliminated.

Group 2

|-
!colspan=5 style="background-color:#D0F0C0;" |7 / 14 September 1988

|-
!colspan=5 style="background-color:#D0F0C0;" |6 / 27 October 1988

|}
Spartak Plovdiv was eliminated.

Group 3

|-
!colspan=5 style="background-color:#D0F0C0;" |7 / 14 September 1988

|-
!colspan=5 style="background-color:#D0F0C0;" |6 / 27 October 1988
|-

|}
Akademik Sofia was eliminated.

Group 4

|-
!colspan=5 style="background-color:#D0F0C0;" |7 / 14 September 1988

|-
!colspan=5 style="background-color:#D0F0C0;" |6 / 27 October 1988

|}
Pavlikeni was eliminated.

Group 5

|-
!colspan=5 style="background-color:#D0F0C0;" |7 / 14 September 1988

|-
!colspan=5 style="background-color:#D0F0C0;" |6 / 27 October 1988

|}
Cherno More Varna was eliminated.

Group 6

|-
!colspan=5 style="background-color:#D0F0C0;" |7 / 14 September 1988

|-
!colspan=5 style="background-color:#D0F0C0;" |6 / 27 October 1988

|}
Dobrudzha Dobrich was eliminated.

Group 7

|-
!colspan=5 style="background-color:#D0F0C0;" |7 / 14 September 1988

|-
!colspan=5 style="background-color:#D0F0C0;" |6 / 27 October 1988

|}
Marek Dupnitsa was eliminated.

Group 8

|-
!colspan=5 style="background-color:#D0F0C0;" |7 / 14 September 1988

|-
!colspan=5 style="background-color:#D0F0C0;" |6 / 27 October 1988

|}
Arda Kardzhali was eliminated.

Second round

|-
!colspan=5 style="background-color:#D0F0C0;" |16 / 23 November 1988

|}

Third round
In this round include the four teams, who participated in the European tournaments (CSKA, Levski, Botev Plovdiv and Slavia)

|-
!colspan=4 style="background-color:#D0F0C0;" |10 December 1988

|}

Quarter-finals

|-
!colspan=4 style="background-color:#D0F0C0;" |16-17 December 1988

|-
!colspan=4 style="background-color:#D0F0C0;" |14 February 1989

|}

Semi-finals

Third place play-off

Final

Details

References

1988-89
1988–89 domestic association football cups
Cup